South Shore Plaza is a shopping mall in Braintree, Massachusetts, owned by Simon Property Group. It is near the Braintree Split interchange, off the I-93 / US 1 and Route 37 junction. The mall opened as an open-air plaza in 1961; it was enclosed in 1976 and expanded between 1995 and 1996.

, the mall's anchor stores are DSW, Macy's, Nordstrom, Sears, Primark, and Target. Previous anchors include Circuit City, Filene's, Filene's Basement, Jordan Marsh, and Lord & Taylor.

History

Opening and expansion 
South Shore Plaza originally opened in 1961 as an open-air plaza with a  Filene's and thirty smaller stores. A  Jordan Marsh opened in 1967. The center was enclosed in 1976 and saw additional anchors, such as Lord & Taylor in 1979 and Sears in 1980, when the mall reached 100 stores. In 1995 and 1996, a second level was added, including the "Boardwalk Cafes" food court, and the Filene's store was expanded to include a home store. This nearly doubled the mall's size, giving it a bright and airy feel, largely because of abundant skylighting and spacious corridors. Also in 1996, the Jordan Marsh store was renamed Macy's. In 1998, Simon Property Group acquired the mall owner, Corporate Property Investors, and assumed management.

Effects of Federated–May merger 
In 2005, May Department Stores, at the time the parent of Lord & Taylor and Filene's, was acquired by Federated Department Stores, the owner of Macy's. As a result, the Filene's store was briefly closed in March 2006, before using the space to relocate its Macy's store that May. The remainder of the Filene's stores were converted Macy's later that year. Federated sold the Lord & Taylor chain later that year and sold the vacant Jordan Marsh/Macy's space to Simon Property Group. Filene's Basement, one of the mall's former anchors, filed for bankruptcy protection on May 4, 2009. New York's Crown Acquisitions made a bid to buy Filene's Basement including their famous Downtown Crossing location which closed for reconstruction in 2007. The South Shore Plaza store in Braintree closed in December 2011.

Redevelopment 
A redevelopment opened on the former site of Jordan Marsh on March 26, 2010. The center now holds , making it New England's largest mall, and includes a newly constructed three-level,  Nordstrom, though the Jordan Marsh building was four stories. Simon Property Group announced on May 12, 2009, that they were in negotiations with the town of Braintree and Target to include a Target store on the lowest level of the 3 level mall addition. Its grand opening was on October 10, 2010. Numerous high-end retailers have joined the mall in the Nordstrom wing, including Sur La Table, Vera Bradley, and Sephora. The mall also received new carpeting, wall decor, food court seating/televisions, and signage as part of the renovations. The parking deck bridges that once connected to Jordan Marsh have now been restored.

In 2017, the Irish clothing retailer, Primark, opened in the former top level of Sears.

On August 27, 2020, Lord & Taylor announced it would shutter it's brick-and-mortar fleet after modernizing into a digital collective department store.

List of anchor stores

Incidents 
On July 3, 2020, a gunman fired six shots in the mall, injuring a 15-year-old girl. The gunman was sentenced to eight years in prison followed by three years of probation.

On January 22, 2022, one man shot another during a confrontation in Forever 21. Two days later, it was announced that the victim, 26-year old Dijoun C. Beasley from Dorchester, Massachusetts, had passed away due to his injuries after being taken to Boston Medical Center for treatment. Following the shooting, police also stated that the killing was gang-related.

In pop culture 
In 2008, the mall was used to film sequences of the movie Paul Blart: Mall Cop.

References

External links 
 Simon Malls
 South Shore Plaza

Buildings and structures in Braintree, Massachusetts
Shopping malls established in 1961
Shopping malls in Massachusetts
Simon Property Group
Tourist attractions in Norfolk County, Massachusetts